Balraj (born Balasegaram Kandiah) was a senior commander of the Liberation Tigers of Tamil Eelam (LTTE).

Early life
Balraj was the fifth and youngest child of Kandiah and Kannagias. He received his primary education in Kokkuthoduwaai (in Mullaitheevu district) and his secondary education in Pulmoddai (in Trincomalee district). After he passed his O levels, his parents wanted to send him to university; however, due to civil unrest throughout the country they were unable to do so. Balraj was fluent in Tamil, Sinhala and English. Although none of his siblings joined the Tamil Tigers, some of his nephews and nieces did.

Personal life
At the suggestion of Velupillai Prabhakaran (who trusted Balraj), Balraj married Varathaa (a relative of Prabhakaran). The marriage was difficult, and the couple soon separated. Varathaa later died of a snake bite, emotionally affecting Balraj despite their estrangement.

LTTE
As a student, Balraj was recruited by the People's Liberation Organisation of Tamil Eelam (PLOTE) by Suntharam (one of its leaders). PLOTE differed from the Liberation Tigers of Tamil Eelam (LTTE, the primary Tamil nationalist organisation) in tactics, favouring the widespread formation of sleeper cells over the LTTE's hit-and-run tactics. As a result of this, Balraj had little opportunity to fight in open combat (which frustrated him). He decided to switch allegiance when the 1983 riots began, contacting a teacher who was an LTTE recruiter and accepted Balraj despite his PLOTE background. He was initially a part-time member, becoming a full-time member by 1984. Balraj's ability was recognized by Mahattaya, although he was suspected by Velupillai Prabhakaran due to his PLOTE background and restricted to the role of a helper rather than a fighter.

When conflict began with the Indian Peace Keeping Force (IPKF), most of the LTTE leadership fled into the jungle; at this point, Balraj's abilities in conventional and psychological warfare became known. He commanded the LTTE's first conventional fighting formation, the Charles Anthony Brigade, which distinguished itself during the Second Battle of Elephant Pass in which Balraj landed by sea (rather than by land) on the Jaffna peninsula . The LTTE (unlike many separatist organisations) was considered the only non-government military organisation capable of complex military manoeuvres, largely as a result  of this battle.

Balraj preferred to fight on the front line amidst heavy shelling and bombing, rather than within the confines of a command centre. During his last years, he was often requested by Prabhakaran for assistance on the battlefield (where Balraj remained for many hours, impacting his health. After being hospitalized in Puthukkudiyiruppu, he returned to the battlefield to supervise. According to Theepan, Balraj participated in an ambush at Munthirikaikkulam in which fourteen SLA soldiers were killed and several weapons seized.

Balraj was aware in 2008 that the Sri Lankan Army was breaking through the LTTE's defences and would soon capture Kilinochchi (as they did after Balraj's death, on 2 January 2009), referring to it as the final battle for Eelam (an accurate prediction, since the LTTE were defeated as a conventional army on 19 May).

Second Battle of Elephant Pass
In the Second Battle of Elephant Pass, Balraj led 1,200 cadres behind enemy lines. The Sri Lankan Army maintained a strong defence, but Balraj cut off their supplies and attacked from three directions (an action considered impossible by a US Advisor visiting the site several months earlier. The attack was noted for heavy Sri Lankan Army casualties (without air support) and because Balraj, instead of taking an overland route, moved by sea with the aid of Colonel Soosai. The operation was facilitated by Brigadier Theepan and Karuna Amman, who attacked the Sri Lankan Army south of Elephant Pass and blocked reinforcements.

LTTE military academy
When Balraj's health began to deteriorate, he gave lectures and instructions to LTTE recruits. Balraj taught military strategy, planning and tactics, providing specialised training for LTTE commandos and special forces.

Relationship with Tamils
Balraj interacted with the Tamil people in Sri Lanka as he moved through it, becoming one of the most popular members of the Liberation Tigers of Tamil Eelam because of his simplicity and accessibility. Often acting as an intermediary between the Tamil people and the LTTE leadership, he generally travelled on foot or bicycle without a bodyguard rather than in vehicles. This was unique among LTTE commanders, and Balraj's approach to the Tamils created some friction with other LTTE authorities.

Politics
Balraj did not participate in politics, and acknowledged Velupillai Prabhakaran as the leader of the LTTE and Tamil Eelam.

Health
He was injured before he received military training in Tamil Nadu, and was wounded three times in confrontations with the Indian Army. Balraj was frequently wounded in battle against the Sri Lankan Army, and had heart problems; he was hospitalised for two weeks for heart surgery in Singapore during the 2003 ceasefire. His emotional health was severely affected by the death of his wife.

Death
Balraj died on 20 May 2008 at 2:00 p.m. of a heart attack. He was promoted posthumously to Brigadier because he had been responsible for many LTTE victories on the battlefield against the Sri Lankan Army. A three-day period of mourning, from 21 to 23 May, was declared by the LTTE.

References

External links
Brigadier Balraj passes away - LTTE

1965 births
2008 deaths
Liberation Tigers of Tamil Eelam members
Sri Lankan rebels
Sri Lankan Tamil rebels
Indian Peace Keeping Force